The 2010 PDC Women's World Championship was the only ever staging of the PDC Women's World Darts Championship, and the first women's tournament to be organised by the Professional Darts Corporation. It was one of the three new tournaments that the PDC created in 2010, following the rejection of its offer to buy out the British Darts Organisation.

The initial stages of the tournament were played at the Metrodome in Barnsley on 12 June. The final was played during the World Matchplay at the Empress Ballroom in Blackpool, on Saturday July 24, where Stacy Bromberg defeated Tricia Wright to become the only champion of the event.

Prize money

Qualification
Qualification was achieved at 20 tournaments throughout the UK and also various national tournaments throughout the world. Anastasia Dobromyslova did not have to qualify as she is already a member of the PDPA.

The participants are:

Qualification tournaments
  Irina Armstrong
  Ann Chilton
  Tara Deamer
  Clare Bywaters
  Glad Davies
  Paula Clemett
  Juliet Findley
  Deta Hedman
  Emma Pearce
  Rebecca Rose
  Donna Rainsley
  Louise Carroll
  Sue Cusick
  Fiona Carmichael
  Tricia Wright
  Kate Monaghan
  Linda Jones
  Marlene Badger
  Terri-Ann Bellamy
  Zoe McIntyre

PDPA Member
  Anastasia Dobromyslova

National Championships qualifiers
  Sharon O'Brien
  Denise Cassidy
  Stefanie Lück
  Sabrina Spörle
  Stacy Bromberg
  Cindy Hayhurst
  Lavinia Hogg
  Deana Rosenblom
  Marika Juhola
  Irina Borovkova
  Kazumi Nakagawa

Draw

Players in bold denote match winners.

Representation from different countries
This table shows the number of players by country in the World Championship.

References

External links 
Results at dartsdatabase.co.uk

PDC Women's World Darts Championship
PDC Women's World Darts Championship
Professional Darts Corporation tournaments
International sports competitions hosted by England
PDC Women's World Darts Championship
PDC Women's World Darts Championship
Sport in Barnsley
Sport in Blackpool
World championships in darts